Shamim Osman (born 28 February 1961) is a Bangladesh Awami League politician and the current member of parliament from Narayanganj-4 constituency.

Career
Osman was elected as a member of parliament at the 7th National Parliamentary Elections in June 1996 from Narayanganj-4. Osman received 73,349 votes while his nearest rival, Sirajul Islam of the Bangladesh Nationalist Party received 63,866 votes. He contested the 2001 Bangladeshi general election as a candidate of Awami League from Narayanganj-4 and lost. He received 106,104 votes while the winner, Muhammad Gias Uddin of Bangladesh Nationalist Party received 137,323. After losing the position in 2001, he went on self-exile in India and Canada.

Bangladesh Police searched Osman's home in Narayanganj on 24 November 2003 when he was in Canada.

In November 2004, Osman's political rival, Mominullah Liton also known as David was killed in a crossfire by Rapid Action Battalion.

On 1 May 2007, Osman was sentenced to jail for three years in a case filed by the Anti Corruption Commission. On 14 August, a court ordered his property to be seized for tax evasion. In September 2007, the Anti Corruption Commission sued Osman and his wife for illegal wealth and submitted the charge sheet in April 2008. On 12 September, he was sentenced to eight years imprisonment in a tax evasion case.

On 12 January 2009, Justices A. B. M. Khairul Haque and Md Abdul Hye of the Bangladesh High Court rejected Osman's petition seeking bail in three cases filed by the Anti Corruption Commission and the National Board of Revenue. After around eight years, Osman came back to Narayanganj in April 2009 when Bangladesh Awami League party returned to power.  On 11 February, he received bail two cases in which he was sentenced to three and eight years imprisonment. In 2011, he lost the Narayanganj City Mayoral election to Selina Hayat Ivy. He had received 78,000 votes in the city election. On 7 April 2011, Bangladesh High Court squashed the Anti Corruption Commission case in which he was sentenced to three years imprisonment.

Osman was accused by Samrat Hossain Emily, a former national football player, of assaulting him in October 2013. On 8 March 2013, a 17-year-old student Tanvir Mohammad Toki was found dead in Narayanganj two days after he had gone missing. The victim's father, Rafiur Rabbi, accused Osman's family of the killing of his son. On 25 March, High Court denied anticipatory bail to Osman and his son Ayon Osman. Osman filed a defamation lawsuit against Ivy.

For the 2014 Bangladesh general election, the party picked Osman to contest for Narayanganj-4 constituency, dropping the incumbent Kabori Sarwar. He was elected unopposed after the main Bangladesh Nationalist Party boycotted the election. By 2014, Awami League in Narayanganj had divided in two fractions, one loyal to Osman and another to Ivy. He had threatened ASP Mohammad Bashiruddin for not allowing Awami League activists to stuff ballots.

Osman was re-elected to parliament from Narayanganj in the 2018 Bangladeshi general election as a candidate of Awami League. He received 393,136 votes while his nearest rival, Monir Hossein of Bangladesh Nationalist Party, received 76,582.

Khela Hobe is a popular political slogan in Bangladesh and India, especially in West Bengal and Assam. The slogan was first used by Bangladeshi politician Osman. Prominent politicians from India have used 'Khela Hobe' repeatedly.

Personal life
Osman's older brother, Nasim Osman, was a member of parliament from the Jatiya Party. His younger brother, Salim Osman, is a member of parliament from the Jatiya Party from Narayanganj-5. He elder brother, Nasim Osman (died 2014), was the member of parliament from Narayanganj-5 from Jatiya Party. Their father AKM Samsuzzoha was a member of the first parliament of Bangladesh, and their grandfather, M Osman Ali, was a founding member of Bangladesh Awami League.

References

Living people
People from Narayanganj District
Awami League politicians
1961 births
Place of birth missing (living people)
10th Jatiya Sangsad members
11th Jatiya Sangsad members
7th Jatiya Sangsad members
University of Dhaka alumni